The Soviet Civil Administration (SCA) was the government of the northern half of Korea from 24 August 1945 to 9 September 1948 though governed concurrently after the setup of the Provisional People's Committee for North Korea in 1946. Even though formally referred as civilian administration, it was originally a military organization that included civilians of different professions.

It was the administrative structure that the Soviet Union used to govern what would become North Korea following the division of Korea. General Terentii Shtykov was the main proponent of setting up a centralized structure to coordinate Korean  People's Committees. The setup was officially recommended by General Ivan Chistyakov and headed by General Andrei Romanenko in 1945 and by General Nikolai Lebedev in 1946.

Postwar period 

In the postwar period between 1946–1949 the Sakhalin administration (Soviet Union) in anticipation of Japanese evacuation of Karafuto and the Kuril Islands had allegedly established a relationship with SCA in order to secure cheap Korean workforce to be used on Sakhalin fisheries that was about to evacuate from Islands along with Japanese civilians. By 1950 the Korean workforce grew up to 10 thousands people on Sakhalin island only.

During the Soviet occupation, Soviet soldiers committed rape against both Japanese and Korean women alike. Soviet soldiers also looted the property of both Japanese and Koreans living in northern Korea. The Soviets claimed Japanese enterprises in northern Korea and took valuable materials and industrial equipment.

See also

Korea under Japanese rule
History of North Korea
People's Republic of Korea
Provisional People's Committee for North Korea
United States Army Military Government in Korea

References

Korea–Soviet Union relations
History of North Korea
1945 in North Korea
1946 in North Korea
Soviet military occupations